Ƌ (minuscule: ƌ) is a letter of the Latin alphabet.

It was used in the written form of the Zhuang alphabet from 1957 to 1986, when it was replaced by the digraph nd.

Its unicode name is "Letter D with topbar", but the letter looks like a backwards version of the letter B with a topbar (Ƃ).

See also
Ƃ ƃ

Latin-script letters